This is a list of the Permanent Representatives of the Republic of Lithuania to the United Nations. The current office holder since 2021 is Rytis Paulauskas.

List

See also
Foreign relations of Lithuania

References

Lithuania

United Nations